Business & Information Systems Engineering (BISE) is an international scholarly and double-blind reviewed journal which publishes scientific research on the effective and efficient design and utilization of information systems by individuals, groups, enterprises, and society for the improvement of social welfare. Information systems are understood as socio-technical systems comprising tasks, people, and information technology. Research published in the journal examines relevant problems in the analysis, design, implementation and management of information systems and covers areas of information management, computer science, business administration and economics, new media, and operations research. BISE publishes bimonthly, and features a double-blind peer review process.

History 
Business & Information Systems Engineering (BISE) is the English language successor of the  journal WIRTSCHAFTSINFORMATIK, which has been the flagship journal of the German-language Information Systems community for more than 50 years. The German journal elektronische datenverarbeitung, published since 1959, was renamed in Angewandte Informatik in 1971 and again in WIRTSCHAFTSINFORMATIK in 1989, with the first issue published in 1990. To expand its reach in Europe and internationally, and to better reach its international scientific community, WIRTSCHAFTSINFORMATIK has been published in a cover-to-cover English translation under the title Business & Information Systems Engineering (BISE) since issue 1/2009. The strategic decision to better address the international community led to the termination of the German WIRTSCHAFTSINFORMATIK with issue 6/2014, and from issue 1/2015 onwards only the English Business & Information Systems Engineering remains.

Editors-in-Chief 
 Christof Weinhardt: since 2019
 Martin Bichler: 2012 - 2019
 Hans Ulrich Buhl: 2006 - 2013 
 Wolfgang König: 1998–2008 
 Ulrich Hasenkamp: 1992–2000 
 Peter Mertens: 1990–2000 
 Norbert Szyperski: 1971–1991 
 Paul Schmitz: 1969–1991 
 Hans Konrad Schuff: 1959–1968

Types of Submissions 
BISE allows different types of submissions. Research articles are the core of the journal and provide completed research results as original and substantial contributions to the literature. The journal also publishes research notes, which promote the dialogue among the community on new and emerging developments. This can include reports on new conceptual ideas or successful applications in the field, which are relevant to practitioners and encourage future research. BISE also publishes state-of-the-art articles, which survey recent developments in a particular field of interest. All of the above types of submissions are double-blind peer-reviewed research contributions. The Department Human Computer Interaction and Social Computing is accepting Registered Reports since 2019.

Departments 
BISE is segmented into 7 departments for scientific research, covering topics including:
 Business Process Management
 Decision Analytics and Data Science
 Economics of Information Systems
 Enterprise Modeling and Business Ecosystems
 Human Computer Interaction and Social Computing
 Information Systems Engineering and Technology
 Management and Use of Information and Knowledge

Other Sections 
Specific sections in the journal include the following:
 Catchwords, describing emerging technologies and important phenomena for the BISE community;
 Discussion, providing statements of experts on a particular subject relevant to the field;
 Interviews with top scholars and industry representatives.

Affiliations 
BISE is sponsored by the Section “Information Systems” (Wirtschaftsinformatik, WKWI) of the German Association for Business Research (VHB) and the special interest group “Business Informatics” (GI-FB WI) of the Gesellschaft für Informatik e. V. (GI) with more than 1200 members. BISE is also an affiliated journal of the Association for Information Systems (AIS).

Further reading

External links 
 

Information systems
Information systems journals
Business and management journals
English-language journals
German economics journals
Publications established in 2009